Jack Twist is a fictional character in the short story "Brokeback Mountain", by Annie Proulx, and the 2005 film adaptation of the same name where he is portrayed by American actor Jake Gyllenhaal. Jack's story primarily follows the complex sexual and romantic relationship he has with Ennis Del Mar in the American West from 1963 to 1983.

Gyllenhaal received a BAFTA Award for Best Supporting Actor and was nominated for the Academy Award for Best Supporting Actor and Screen Actors Guild Award for Best Supporting Actor for his performance.

Characterization
In an interview about her work, and "Brokeback Mountain" in particular, author Proulx stated Jack Twist is a "confused Wyoming ranch kid" who finds himself in a personal sexual situation he did not foresee, nor can understand. She said both men were "beguiled by the cowboy myth", and Jack "settles on rodeo as an expression of the Western ideal. It more or less works for him until he becomes a tractor salesman." Jack is also more romantic than Ennis, being the one who pursues the relationship and insists that they should live together officially. He is open about his desires and discontents, which is also shown in the novella, when he tries to open his wife Lureen's eyes about their son's dyslexia even though he knows that he has no say in the matter, since she holds the money in the family.

Sexual orientation
One mystery surrounding Jack Twist (as well as Ennis Del Mar) is his sexual orientation. He has a sexual and emotional relationship with Lureen, but he still shows more sexual desire towards men in general than Ennis, who has no relations with men other than Jack. Jack sleeps with other men, including male prostitutes. While meeting Ennis in the mountains for the very last time, Jack says he is having an extramarital relationship with a woman; however, it is likely that the woman, the "ranch foreman's wife", is actually the ranch foreman himself, as in a previous scene, he invites Jack to a cabin to "do a little fishing and drink some whisky ...". In a later scene, Jack's father mentions to Ennis that Jack had revealed a plan before he died to come up with a male friend to the family ranch and live there.

Some film critics suggest Jack is bisexual rather than strictly homosexual. Sex researcher Fritz Klein stated he felt Jack to be more "toward the gay side of bisexuality." Gyllenhaal himself took the opinion that Ennis and Jack were heterosexual men who "develop this love, this bond", also saying in a Details interview: "I approached the story believing that these are actually two straight guys who fall in love." The film's producer, James Schamus, and LGBT non-fiction author Eric Marcus, opined that the characters were both gay.

Novelist Brent Hartinger analyzed some of the discussion about the sexual orientations of the characters, writing for AfterElton.com. Hartinger personally "felt it inconceivable" that the characters could be considered bisexual and not gay because the film consistently showed their dissatisfaction with their heterosexual partners and deep emotional and physical fulfillment with one another. Hartinger added that Del Mar insists on anal sex with his wife, and Twist seeks out other males for sex outside of his marriage when Del Mar is not available. Hartinger puts down efforts to describe the characters as bisexual to a mixture of bisexuals who misunderstand "what it means to be gay" and some who rightfully feel starved of media representations of bisexuality. For Hartinger, the actors' opinions of "straight guys who just happened to fall in love" seems to come more from Gyllenhaal and Ledger's acting method rather than an assessment of the text. Hartinger ended the discussion with a quotation from Proulx, on the subject of her short story, to illuminate the ways in which different people interpret the sexualities of the main characters:

Fictional character history

Jack is born in about 1943 or 1944, and grows up in Lightning Flat, in the northeastern corner of Wyoming. At some point, he drops out of high school. While on a 1963 shepherding job on the fictional Brokeback Mountain in Wyoming, rodeo cowboy Jack meets and falls in love with ranch hand Ennis Del Mar (portrayed in the film by Heath Ledger).

When the two 19-year-old men first begin work on Brokeback Mountain, Ennis is stationed at the base camp while Jack watches after the sheep higher on the mountain. They initially meet only for meals at the base camp, where they gradually become friends. After a time they switch roles, with Jack taking over duties at base camp and Ennis tending the flock. One night, after the two share a bottle of whiskey, Ennis decides to remain at the base camp overnight instead of returning up the mountain. He shivers noticeably in the cold weather, and Jack suggests he come in the tent to get warm. Ennis is at first reluctant to even sleep in the same tent as Jack, but later that night the men share a brief, intense sexual encounter. Over the remainder of the summer their sexual and emotional relationship deepens further.

After the job is finished the two part ways. Jack tries to get the same job again at Brokeback Mountain, but his former employer, having seen him and Ennis in a sexual encounter, refuses to rehire him. Jack then moves to Texas, where he meets and eventually marries rodeo princess Lureen Newsome (portrayed in the film by Anne Hathaway) and has a son, Bobby, with her.

Four years after they separate from each other, Jack sends a postcard to Ennis, asking if he wants to meet him while he passes through the area. The men reunite, and their passion immediately rekindles. Jack broaches the subject of creating a life together on a small ranch. Ennis resists, fearing that they will be killed if their relationship is put out in the open. Ennis and Jack settle for infrequent meetings on camping trips in the mountains.

As the years pass, Ennis' marriage eventually ends in divorce, causing Jack to hope that this will allow him and Ennis to live together. But Ennis continues to refuse to move away from his children, and remains uncomfortable about men living together. On another trip with Ennis in the mountains, in 1983, Jack discovers that in order to keep his job, Ennis cannot meet with Jack again before November. Ennis and Jack's frustrations finally erupt into a bitter argument and a struggle that becomes a desperate embrace. The two men part, upset and angry with each other.

Months later, a postcard Ennis sent to Jack about meeting in November, has returned to the post office, stamped deceased. In a strained telephone conversation, Lureen tells Ennis that Jack died in an accident while changing a tire; Ennis, however, suspects that he was murdered by men who discovered his secret life. Lureen tells Ennis that Jack wished to have his ashes scattered on Brokeback Mountain, and suggests that he contact Jack's parents.

Ennis visits Jack's parents in Lightning Flat, Wyoming and offers to take Jack's ashes to Brokeback Mountain. Jack's father refuses, insisting that Jack's remains be buried in the family plot. Jack's mother is more welcoming, and allows Ennis to see Jack's boyhood bedroom. While in the room, Ennis discovers two old shirts hidden in the back of the closet. The shirts, hung one inside the other on the same hanger, are the ones the two men were wearing on their last day on Brokeback Mountain in 1963. Ennis takes the now rolled-up shirts with him; Jack's mother silently offers him a paper sack to put them in.

At the end of the story, Ennis opens his own closet to reveal that he has hung the two shirts reversed, with his plaid shirt hugging Jack's blue shirt. They hang inside the door beneath a postcard of Brokeback Mountain. Ennis carefully fastens the top button of Jack's shirt. With tears in his eyes, Ennis mutters, "Jack, I swear ...".

See also
 List of LGBT characters in modern written fiction

References

Brokeback Mountain
Characters in short stories
Fictional LGBT characters in film
Fictional characters from Wyoming
Fictional characters from Texas
Fictional cowboys and cowgirls
Literary characters introduced in 1997
Drama film characters
Fictional LGBT characters in literature